Manor house in Podstolice - historic manor house in Podstolice, in Września Country, in Greater Poland.

Description 
This is a manor house of wooden construction from 1890, it has a basement and two floors. The building of 1200 m² is surrounded by a hundred-year-old park with a pond.

History 
The history of the manor house goes back to the nineteenth century, when the owner of Podstolice village was count Hedogron Kierski. He started the construction of a neoclassical building in 1890. In 1920 the owner of Podstolice was Baron Stronbetzky. In the interwar period it became the property of the Polish State Treasury and its tenant was Stanisław Karłowski. Over the period of the Second World War the estate was managed by trustee (Treuhänder) Neubert. After the war it was under the management of Podstolice Provincial Land Office, and the area of the manor was managed in the 1950 by Agricultural Cooperative. Since 1992, the owners of the manor have been Mrs and Mr Kareński from Poznań.

Gallery

Sources 
 .
 .

External links 
  Podstolice - Polish Monuments - castles, palaces and manor houses in Poland catalog
  Monumental manor house in Podstolice

Podstolice
Podstolice
Gmina Nekla
Articles containing video clips